Adrià Guerrero Aguilar (born 28 January 1998) is a Spanish professional footballer who plays for Swiss club FC Zürich as a left back.

Career

Reus
Born in Blanes, Girona, Catalonia, Guerrero joined FC Barcelona's youth academy in 2010 from UE Vilassar de Mar. In August 2017, after finishing his development, he signed for CF Reus Deportiu and was assigned to the reserves in Tercera División.

Guerrero made his senior debut on 20 August 2017, starting in a 0–0 away draw against Palamós CF, and scored his first goal on 1 October in a 1–1 home draw to AE Prat. The following 11 January, he renewed his contract until 2021.

On 27 June 2018, Guerrero was definitely promoted to the first team in Segunda División. His first match in the competition took place on 19 August, when he came on as a second-half substitute for Álex Carbonell in a 0–2 away loss against UD Las Palmas.

Valencia
Halfway through the 2018–19 season, Guerrero and the rest of the squad left after the club was expelled by the Liga de Fútbol Profesional, and he later moved to Valencia CF Mestalla of Segunda División B. He made his first team – and La Liga – debut on 4 July 2020, replacing Jaume Costa at half-time in a 2–2 away draw against Granada CF.

On 20 August 2020, Guerrero joined Swiss Super League side FC Lugano on loan for the 2020–21 season.

Zürich
On 30 June 2021 he signed a three-year-contract with Swiss Super League side FC Zürich.

References

External links

1998 births
Living people
People from Selva
Sportspeople from the Province of Girona
Spanish footballers
Footballers from Catalonia
Association football defenders
La Liga players
Segunda División players
Segunda División B players
Tercera División players
UE Vilassar de Mar players
CF Reus Deportiu B players
CF Reus Deportiu players
Valencia CF Mestalla footballers
Valencia CF players
Swiss Super League players
FC Lugano players
FC Zürich players
Spanish expatriate footballers
Spanish expatriate sportspeople in Switzerland
Expatriate footballers in Switzerland